Jackson Park (Irish: Páirc Uí Sheáin) is an association football stadium in the Republic of Ireland based in Kilternan, Dún Laoghaire–Rathdown. It is currently the home of Wayside Celtic F.C.

See also
 List of association football stadiums in the Republic of Ireland

Association football venues in the Republic of Ireland
Sports venues in Dún Laoghaire–Rathdown
Wayside Celtic F.C.
DLR Waves
Association football venues in County Dublin